Sunturion is the name of two fictional characters appearing in American comic books published by Marvel Comics.

Publication history
The first character, also called Arthur Dearborn debuted in Iron Man #143 (February 1981) and was created by writers David Michelinie, Bob Layton, and penciler John Romita Jr.

The second character, Mike Stone, first appeared in Daredevil #224 (November 1985) and was created by writer Jim Owsley and penciller Dan Jurgens.

Fictional character biography

Arthur Dearborn

The Roxxon Energy Corporation in conjunction with the Brand Corporation, their genetic research subsidiary, convert Roxxon employee Arthur Dearborn into a being of living microwave energy called Sunturion, who serves as crew and guardian for "Star Well I", a Roxxon solar satellite that orbits Earth and transmits microwave energy to the planet; the transformation was required as otherwise the cost of developing Star Well to provide for a full crew would have made the project too expensive, but as Sunturion Dearborn's personal requirements were fairly limited and he could do far more work than any normal man.

An accident on Star Well I results in the death of the entire town of Allentown, Iowa, and Iron Man arrives to investigate and meets with Dearborn. Learning that Dearborn is Sunturion, the pair prevent a meteor shower from damaging Star Well I. After discovering that Star Well I is in fact a Roxxon satellite, Iron Man locates and deactivates a self-destruct device when company director Jonas Hale learns of Iron Man's presence and attempts to destroy the satellite. Iron Man advises Sunturion that, despite his admiration for Dearborn's goals, the satellite is now evidence of Roxxon's criminal activities and must be confiscated. Sunturion attacks Iron Man as he disables the satellite, and during their battle Star Well I's core drifts into Earth's atmosphere. Sunturion apparently sacrifices himself to boost Iron Man's deflector beam, allowing the satellite to be harmlessly deflected into the Gulf of Carpentaria.

Roxxon eventually re-integrates Dearborn's energy form, intending to use him against "Stratosfire", a former female Roxxon employee with abilities almost identical to those of Sunturion. Originally the corporate symbol for Roxxon (as Iron Man is for Stark International), Stratosfire turns against the company when a close friend is murdered for speaking with Tony Stark (Iron Man's alter ego). Sunturion locates Stratosfire and activates her "Zed Control": a Roxxon-implanted self-destruct device that dissipates Stratosfire's microwave energies and reverts Dearborn to his human form.

After Kathy Dare shot Tony Stark, paralyzing him, Arthur speaks as a character witness in support of Stark during her trial. At the time, Stark was preparing to withdraw from public life and become Iron Man full-time, but the testimony of Arthur and others convinces him that there was still value to being Tony Stark.

Dearborn regains his powers as Sunturion during an encounter with Spider-Man, who is attempting to prevent the theft of a payload of the metal vibranium.<ref>Amazing Spider-Man Annual #25; Spectacular Spider-Man #11 & Web of Spider-Man Annual #7 (all December 1991)</ref>

Dearborn learns that his energy form is starting to dissipate, and that he will soon die. After Roxxon refused to help (as it wasn't "cost-effective"), Dearborn attacks their facilities all over the world. In one attack, he encounters the Avengers, and finds his phasing abilities countered by Vision's own. After fleeing the scene, Dearborn is tracked down by Vision, and convinced to go to the Avengers for help. When the Avengers tell him they need more time to analyze his condition, he decides to return to his original plan. Attacking another Roxxon facility, he reveals to the Avengers that Roxxon is replicating the process that created him on others (without telling them of the dangers). After Vision destroys the equipment, Dearborn is convinced to return to Roxxon who no longer having the resources to make more Sunturions has no choice but to try and cure him.

Mike Stone
After Sunturion apparently sacrifices himself to boost Iron Man's deflector beam, allowing the satellite to be harmlessly deflected into the Gulf of Carpentaria, Roxxon develops a suit of armor in an unsuccessful attempt to reform Dearborn. The armor is lost at sea and is eventually found by truck driver Mike Stone while on a fishing trip in Florida. Stone uses the armor to take revenge on a former employer and encounters Daredevil. Lacking Dearborn's mutagenic modifications, Stone is absorbed by the armor and dissipates into the atmosphere when Daredevil damages it.

Powers and abilities
Arthur Dearborn is a normal human who undergoes a mutagenic modification process that converts him into microwave energy. In this converted state Dearborn is capable of projecting microwave energy; creating force fields; teleportation; flight; and absorption of solar radiation to replenish his own energy.

The armor found by Mike Stone provides the wearer with abilities similar to those of Dearborn's energy form. To power itself, however, the armor converts the wearer into microwave energy.

Other versions

What If?
In the What If story "The Leaving", which takes place fifty years into an alternate future, Sunturion is a member of the Avengers.

In other media
 The Arthur Dearborn incarnation of Sunturion appears in the Iron Man episode "Cell of Iron", voiced by David Warner and Tom Kane respectively. This version suffers from a deadly disease that he eliminated through microwave radiation. However, the treatment's side effects cause him to transform into the Sunturion and uncontrollably emit deadly radiation, with the Star Well space station being constructed to give him sanctuary. After A.I.M. targets the station, Iron Man intervenes to help Dearbon, who ultimately sacrifices himself to stop the Star Well from crashing into New York City.
 The Sunturion appears in the Iron Man: Armored Adventures'' episode "The Might of Doom", as a Makluan guardian created by the original Mandarin to guard one of his Makluan rings and test potential successors.

References

External links
 Sunturion at Comic Vine

Characters created by Bob Layton
Characters created by Dan Jurgens
Characters created by David Michelinie
Characters created by John Romita Jr.
Comics characters introduced in 1981
Comics characters introduced in 1985
Marvel Comics mutates
Marvel Comics supervillains

fr:Liste des ennemis de Iron Man#S